The 2012–13 Iowa State Cyclones men's basketball team represented Iowa State University during the 2012–13 NCAA Division I men's basketball season. The Cyclones were coached by Fred Hoiberg, who was in his 3rd season. They played their home games at Hilton Coliseum in Ames, Iowa and competed in the Big 12 Conference.

Previous season

The Cyclones finished 23–11, and 12–6 in Big 12 play to finish 3rd in the regular season conference standings.  They lost to Texas in the quarterfinals of the Big 12 tournament.  They received an at-large bid to the NCAA tournament where they defeated UConn and lost to Kentucky.

Offseason departures

Recruiting

Prep recruits

Roster

Schedule and results

|-
!colspan=12 style=|Exhibition
|-

|-
!colspan=12 style=| Regular Season
|-

|- 
!colspan=12 style=| Big 12 tournament
|-

|-

|-
!colspan=12 style=| NCAA tournament
|-

|-

Rankings

Awards and honors

All-Conference Selections

Will Clyburn (2nd Team)
Melvin Ejim (3rd Team)
Korie Lucious (Honorable Mention)
Tyrus McGee (Honorable Mention)

Academic All-Big 12 First Team

Melvin Ejim
Percy Gibson

Big 12 Newcomer of the Year

Will Clyburn

Big 12 Sixth Man of the Year

Tyrus McGee

Big 12 Scholar Athlete of the Year

Melvin Ejim

Big 12 All-Defensive Team

Chris Babb

Big 12 All-Rookie Team

Will Clyburn

References

Iowa State Cyclones men's basketball seasons
Iowa State
Iowa State
Iowa State Cyc
Iowa State Cyc